The Annihilation of Fish is a 1999 American romance film directed by Charles Burnett and starring Lynn Redgrave, James Earl Jones and Margot Kidder.

Plot

A woman (Lynn Redgrave) who believes a dead composer is in love with her falls in love with a man (James Earl Jones) who constantly fights an imaginary man named Hank.

Cast
 Lynn Redgrave as Poinsettia
 James Earl Jones as "Fish"
 Margot Kidder as Mrs. Muldroone

Reception
The film has a 70% rating on Rotten Tomatoes.

References

External links

1999 romance films
American romance films
Films directed by Charles Burnett (director)
1990s English-language films
1990s American films